James Bernard Walsh (born December 23, 1986) is an American-born competition swimmer who represented the Philippines in the 2004 and 2008 Summer Olympics.

Walsh accepted an athletic scholarship to attend the University of Florida in Gainesville, Florida, where he swam for coach Gregg Troy's Florida Gators swimming and diving team in National Collegiate Athletic Association (NCAA) competition from 2004 to 2008.  Walsh graduated from the University of Florida with a bachelor's degree in exercise and sports science in 2008.

Walsh is the Filipino national record holder in the 200-meter butterfly.

See also 

 Florida Gators
 List of University of Florida alumni
 List of University of Florida Olympians

References 

1986 births
Living people
American sportspeople of Filipino descent
Florida Gators men's swimmers
Male butterfly swimmers
Olympic swimmers of the Philippines
Sportspeople from Pensacola, Florida
Swimmers at the 2004 Summer Olympics
Swimmers at the 2008 Summer Olympics
Swimmers at the 2006 Asian Games
Southeast Asian Games medalists in swimming
Southeast Asian Games gold medalists for the Philippines
Southeast Asian Games silver medalists for the Philippines
Southeast Asian Games bronze medalists for the Philippines
Competitors at the 2009 Southeast Asian Games
Asian Games competitors for the Philippines
Filipino male swimmers
Filipino YouTubers
American male swimmers